The 1936–37 Kansas Jayhawks men's basketball team represented the University of Kansas during the 1936–37 college men's basketball season.

Roster
Roy Holliday
Fred Pralle
Fred Bosilevac
Carl Weidner
Fenlon Durand
George Golay
Sylvester Schmidt
Lyman Corlis
Lester Kappelman
Raymond Noble
Al Wellhausen
Paul Rogers
Dave Lutton

Schedule

References

Kansas Jayhawks men's basketball seasons
Kansas
Kansas
Kansas